Robert Antawon Whaley (born April 16, 1982) is an American former professional basketball player.

High school and college career
Whaley graduated from Benton Harbor High School in 2001. He was a leading contender for Mr. Basketball of Michigan, but Benton Harbor came up just short of winning the championship. He attended Barton County Community College for two years, then transferred to the University of Cincinnati in 2003 and Walsh University in 2004. He was the NAIA Division II Player of the Year in 2004–05 and led Walsh to its first NAIA National Championship. He averaged 19.9 points and 7.5 rebounds in 35 games as a senior. Walsh left the NAIA and joined the NCAA in 2011.

Professional career

Utah Jazz (2005–2006)
Whaley was selected by the Utah Jazz with 51st overall pick in the 2005 NBA draft, becoming the most recent player drafted out of an NAIA school, as of 2018. As a rookie in 2005–06, Whaley appeared in 23 games and averaged 2.1 points and 1.9 rebounds per game. He scored a career-high 11 points on December 23, 2005 against the New York Knicks. On January 26, 2006, he was ruled out indefinitely with torn cartilage in his right knee. He returned to action in March 2006, but appeared in just one further game after returning to injury.

On December 11, 2005, Whaley and teammate Deron Williams got into an altercation with a group of Denver Nuggets fans who were harassing them outside a Park City club. Both Whaley and Williams gave police false names at that time, and both were cited for providing false information to police. Whaley, who sustained a 6-inch cut on his hand at the bar that night, was suspended one game by the Jazz for lying about how he received the injury.
On June 8, 2006, Whaley was traded, along with Kris Humphries, to the Toronto Raptors in exchange for Rafael Araújo. He was later waived by the Raptors on June 21, 2006.

Post-NBA (2006–2008)
After being released by the Toronto Raptors, Whaley moved to the Dominican Republic where he played briefly with Metros de Santiago. For the 2006–07 season, he joined the Twin City Ballers of the American Basketball Association. In March 2007, he left the Ballers and joined Petrochimi Imam of Iran for the rest of the season.

On November 1, 2007, Whaley was selected by the Los Angeles D-Fenders in the second round of the 2007 NBA Development League Draft. He was waived by the team on January 4, 2008, and reacquired on February 13. In 22 games (nine starts) for the D-Fenders in 2007–08, he averaged 4.0 points and 2.7 rebounds in 12.3 minutes per game.

Post-basketball life
In September 2008, Whaley was convicted in Michigan of running a drug house. Having absconded from his probation in January 2009, a National Crime Information Center warrant was issued for his arrest in March 2010. He was arrested in Salt Lake County, and while he was being searched to be booked into jail, officers found several bags of marijuana on his possession. In June 2010, he was extradited to Michigan, and was later sentenced to a two-year jail term in which he served between 2010 and 2012.

In 2014, Whaley became an assistant coach for Utah Elite, a talented AAU program made up primarily of fifth-graders.

On March 7, 2016, Whaley was ordered to serve 60 days in Davis County Jail after pleading guilty to a third-degree felony count of burglary. He was arrested on May 1, 2015 for burglarizing a Layton Marriott Hotel.

References

External links

Robert Whaley  at nba.com
Robert Whaley at ucbearcats.com

1982 births
Living people
African-American basketball players
American expatriate basketball people in the Dominican Republic
American expatriate basketball people in Iran
American men's basketball players
American people convicted of drug offenses
American prisoners and detainees
Barton Cougars men's basketball players
Basketball players from Michigan
Centers (basketball)
Cincinnati Bearcats men's basketball players
Los Angeles D-Fenders players
People from Benton Harbor, Michigan
Petrochimi Bandar Imam BC players
Prisoners and detainees of Michigan
Utah Jazz draft picks
Utah Jazz players
Walsh Cavaliers men's basketball players
American people convicted of burglary
21st-century African-American sportspeople
20th-century African-American people